The United States Post Office in Trenton, Tennessee was built in 1935. It was listed on the National Register of Historic Places in 1988, the nomination for which describes it as "simplified Greek Revival" in style.

References

External links

Post office buildings in Tennessee
National Register of Historic Places in Gibson County, Tennessee
Greek Revival architecture in Tennessee
Buildings and structures completed in 1934
1934 establishments in Tennessee